Richard Alvin Harter (October 14, 1930 – March 12, 2012) was an American basketball coach who served as both a head and assistant coach in both the NBA and NCAA.

Early life
Born in Pottstown, Pennsylvania, Harter attended the University of Pennsylvania in Philadelphia, where he played basketball for the Quakers and graduated in 1953. He served two years as an officer in the U.S. Marine Corps, and then was an assistant freshman coach back at Penn for a year. He then coached at Germantown Academy for three years, then back to Penn in 1959 as an assistant coach.

College head coach
Harter left Penn in 1965 to become head coach at Rider University, then returned to Penn as its head coach. After success at Penn, with just one regular season defeat in his final two seasons, Harter was hired in April 1971 at the University of Oregon in Eugene. He succeeded Steve Belko, who stepped down after fifteen years and consecutive 17–9 seasons to become assistant athletic director.

Harter was regarded as one of the top defensive coaches in the 1970s, where his "Kamikaze Kids" at Oregon in the Pac-8 were known for a swarming defense. Many basketball notables came from Harter's Duck program, including Stu Jackson and former Oregon head coach Ernie Kent. After seven seasons in Eugene, Harter left Oregon in 1978, at a salary of $38,000 annually, for Penn State and $41,000, where he stayed for five seasons.

NBA coach
Harter's first job in the NBA was as an assistant coach with the Detroit Pistons in the 1982–83 season. He left in 1986 to become an assistant for the Indiana Pacers. In 1988, he was hired into his first head coaching position, with the expansion Charlotte Hornets; he was the franchise's first ever head coach. In the team's second season Harter was fired in 1990 during mid-season when the Hornets' record was 8–32.  Harter went on to be an assistant coach for the  New York Knicks under Pat Riley (1991-1994), Portland Trail Blazers under P. J. Carlesimo (1994-1997), Indiana Pacers under Larry Bird (1997-2000),  and Boston Celtics under Jim O'Brien. Harter joined the Philadelphia 76ers' coaching staff on May 5, 2004. On June 13, 2007, Harter joined the Indiana Pacers for the third time, as an assistant coach under O'Brien.

Death
Harter died on March 12, 2012, at the age of 81. The cause of death was cancer, said Penn athletic director Steve Bilsky, a co-captain on the 1971 team. Harter died at a hospital at Hilton Head, South Carolina, where he had a residence.

Head coaching record

College

NBA

|-
|align="left"|Charlotte
|align="left"|
| 82 || 20 || 62 ||  ||align="center"|6th in Atlantic || – || – || – || 
|align="center"|Missed Playoffs
|-
|align="left"|Charlotte
|align="left"|
| 40 || 8 || 32 ||  ||align="center"|(fired)|| – || – || – || 
|align="center"| –
|- class="sortbottom"
|align="left"|Career
| || 122 || 28 || 94 ||  || || – || – || – ||

References

External links
 Dick Harter at Basketball-Reference.com
 Sports-Reference.com – Dick Harter

1930 births
2012 deaths
American men's basketball coaches
Basketball coaches from Pennsylvania
Boston Celtics assistant coaches
Charlotte Hornets head coaches
College men's basketball head coaches in the United States
Detroit Pistons assistant coaches
High school basketball coaches in the United States
Indiana Pacers assistant coaches
New York Knicks assistant coaches
Oregon Ducks men's basketball coaches
Penn Quakers men's basketball coaches
Penn State Nittany Lions basketball coaches
People from Pottstown, Pennsylvania
Philadelphia 76ers assistant coaches
Portland Trail Blazers assistant coaches
Rider Broncs men's basketball coaches
Sportspeople from Montgomery County, Pennsylvania
The Hill School alumni